is a song by Japanese rock band Asian Kung-Fu Generation. It was released as the third single of their second full-length studio album, Sol-fa, on August 4, 2004. In 2016, they re-recorded Rewrite along with all songs from Sol-fa and released on November 30, 2016.

Reception
The song experienced immense domestic and international popularity after it was chosen as the fourth and final opening theme of the first Fullmetal Alchemist anime series. Peaking at number four on the Oricon charts, the single sold nearly 150,000 units by the end of the year it was released, making it the 63rd single of the year. It later went on to win Best Anime Theme Song at the 2007 American Anime Awards.

The song is listed on the appendix of Robert Dimery's book 1001 Songs You Must Hear Before You Die (And 10001 You Must Download).

Music video
The music video for "Rewrite" was directed by Kazuyoshi Oku. The video primarily features the band playing in front of enormous speakers. During the song's breakdown, they temporarily levitate in the air. In 2016, they released new music video of Rewrite to promote Sol-fa 2016. The video primarily features the band playing in front of fans and speakers. During the song's breakdown, they drowned in a sea.

Track listing

Personnel
Masafumi Gotoh – lead vocals, rhythm guitar
Kensuke Kita – lead guitar, background vocals
Takahiro Yamada –  bass, background vocals
Kiyoshi Ijichi – drums
Asian Kung-Fu Generation – producer
Tohru Takayama – mixing, recording
Mitsuharu Harada – mastering
Kenichi Nakamura – recording
Yusuke Nakamura – single cover art

Charts

Certifications

Cover versions and media usage
 American rock band, Darling Thieves, covered this song with English lyrics in 2012.
 The song was used for karaoke scene in 2019 Japanese film, Startup Girls.
 Japanese voice actor and singer, Shugo Nakamura, covered this song for cover song project CrosSing and released it in 2022.
 Japanese singer, Nano, covered this song with English lyrics on her 2023 album, NOIXE.

References

2004 singles
2004 songs
Asian Kung-Fu Generation songs
Ki/oon Music singles
Fullmetal Alchemist songs
Songs written by Masafumi Gotoh